Doug Geiss (born December 29, 1969) is an American politician from Michigan. Geiss is a former Democratic member of Michigan House of Representatives.

Education 
In 1992, Geiss earned a Bachelor of Science degree in Engineering from University of Michigan. In 2000, Geiss earned an MBA from University of Michigan.

Career 
In 2001, Geiss served the city council in Taylor, Michigan. In 2008, Geiss became a member of  Michigan House of Representatives.

In January 2013, Geiss, together with Rep. Dian Slavens, became the first Members to vote against the election or re-election of the Speaker of the House since the 1960s when he voted against the re-election of Jase Bolger to serve as Speaker for the 97th Legislature.

Personal life 
Geiss's wife is Erika Geiss. They have two children.

References

External life 
 2011-2012 Michigan Manual: State Representative Douglas A. Geiss

1969 births
Living people
Democratic Party members of the Michigan House of Representatives
Michigan city council members
People from Royal Oak, Michigan
People from Taylor, Michigan
University of Michigan College of Engineering alumni
Ross School of Business alumni
21st-century American politicians